The Rolling Stones' US Tour 1978 was a concert tour of the United States that took place during June and July 1978, immediately following the release of the group's 1978 album Some Girls. Like the 1972 and 1975 U.S. tours, Bill Graham was the tour promoter. One opening act was Peter Tosh, who was sometimes joined by Mick Jagger for their duet "Don't Look Back". The Outlaws backed up Peter Tosh. Another act opening that day was Etta James, famous for her classic song “At Last”.

History
The tour used a stripped back, minimal stage show compared to the  previous Tour of the Americas '75 and Tour of Europe '76, possibly due to the emergence of the punk rock scene and its emphasis solely on music and attitude rather than presenting a grandiose stage extravaganza.

Continuing a schedule started in 1966 of touring the United States exactly every three years, the Stones played in a mixture of theatres, sometimes under a pseudonym (i.e., at the start of the 1978 US Tour in Lakeland, Florida, The Stones were billed on the ticket as "The Great Southeast Stoned Out Wrestling Champions"), arenas, and stadiums, a practice that they would follow for many of their future tours as well.  The tour was the first in which Charlie Watts used the famous Gretsch drum set that he continued to play with the Stones until his death, as well as his first employment of a china cymbal as a crash. The concerts featured backing vocals by Ronnie Wood and Keith Richards, something that the Stones would get away from beginning with their next tour when Richards handled the majority of the backing vocals himself.

However, this United States tour did not carry on into Europe in 1979, breaking the group's similar schedule of performing in Europe every three years, which had started in 1967. This gap-year from touring prompted Keith Richards to join Ronnie Wood on his 1979 United States solo tour, to promote his then-album Gimme Some Neck, in the process forming the band The New Barbarians.

Reception
Rock critic Robert Christgau wrote that the 1978 Tour was an improvement over the group's previous go-around, "especially when Mick [Jagger] stopped prancing long enough to pick up a guitar and get into the good new songs from Some Girls."
This was billed as the "Farewell Tour' as, at the time, it was going to be their last.
The tour is widely believed among fans to be one of the band's greatest, largely because it was in many ways back to basics both in musical and visual terms. It meant a return to a mixture of classic Stones numbers ("Tumbling Dice", "Star Star", "Happy", "Street Fighting Man", etc.) mixed with blues numbers and Chuck Berry covers ("Sweet Little Sixteen" in particular, in light of his music's influence on Keith Richards and 1978 being the Stones's sixteenth anniversary), as well as including a large number of songs from the then-newly-released Some Girls LP. It was the first tour featuring songs written with Ronnie Wood as an official member of the Rolling Stones, and his contributions from this period are considered by many Stones fans as some of his greatest with the band. While no live album was released immediately following this tour, a fair amount of bootleg releases showcased its musical qualities – most notably the multi-show King Biscuit Flower Hour FM recording often known as "Handsome Girls". In 2011, a CD and DVD set was released of a July 1978 performance from Fort Worth, Texas entitled Some Girls: Live In Texas '78. In addition to the complete concert, the DVD included footage of the tour rehearsals and the three songs the Rolling Stones performed live on the Saturday Night Live television show in October 1978.

Guest artists that played with the Stones during individual shows included Linda Ronstadt, Eddie Money, Doug Kershaw, Bobby Keys and Nicky Hopkins. Opening acts included Van Halen, Journey, Peter Tosh, Patti Smith, Southside Johnny and the Asbury Jukes, Foreigner, Eddie Money, Kansas, Etta James, Furry Lewis, Atlanta Rhythm Section, April Wine, The Outlaws, and the Doobie Brothers.

Personnel

The Rolling Stones
Mick Jagger – lead vocals, guitar, keyboards
Keith Richards – guitars, vocals
Ronnie Wood – guitars, pedal steel guitar, backing vocals
Bill Wyman – bass guitar
Charlie Watts – drums

Additional musicians

Ian Stewart – piano
Ian McLagan – keyboards, backing vocals

Tour set list
A typical set list for the tour, with minor variations involving one or two of the numbers being omitted:

 "Let It Rock" (Chuck Berry)
 "All Down the Line"
 "Honky Tonk Women"
 "Star Star"
 "When the Whip Comes Down"
 "Beast of Burden"
 "Lies"
 "Miss You"
 "Just My Imagination (Running Away with Me)"
 "Shattered"
 "Respectable"
 "Far Away Eyes"
 "Love in Vain"
 "Tumbling Dice"
 "Happy"
 "Sweet Little Sixteen (Chuck Berry)"
 "Brown Sugar"
 "Jumpin' Jack Flash"
 Encore: "(I Can't Get No) Satisfaction", "Street Fighting Man" (most shows had no encore).

"Hound Dog" (played only in Lexington and Memphis)

Tour dates

Notes

See also
Live in Texas '78, documentary film about the recording of tour

References

External links
 'Rocks Off' page tour setlists

The Rolling Stones concert tours
1978 concert tours
1978 in American music
June 1978 events in the United States
July 1978 events in the United States
Concert tours of the United States